Alan R. White (born October 27, 1941), is an American Top 40 disc jockey, pioneering nightclub DJ, booking agent, talent manager, record producer, disco innovator, nightclub operator and promoter, radio and television personality, dance event promoter, an internet broadcasting pioneer, and author.

Early life 
White was born in Bridgeport, Connecticut, on October 27, 1941. He is the only child of Ray E. & Doris P. White. During his youth, the family would later relocate to Torrington in northwestern Connecticut. As a youngster, White was a student at Rumsey Hall School from 1952 until his graduation in 1956.

Musician 
White dropped out of high school in 1957, and worked various jobs in and around Torrington. In 1958, he moved to Baltimore, Maryland, where he worked during the day in the IBM department of Loyola Federal Savings and Loan, and played drums by night at some of Baltimore's red light district nightclubs, in an area famously known as "The Block."

In his late teenage years, he played drums for a number of local bands that served the triangle region of northwestern Connecticut, southeastern New York state and southwestern Massachusetts. Between 1960 through 1963, White was a founding member of the rockabilly-influenced trio Turk and The Party Cats alongside frontman Turk Coury (vocals & rhythm guitar) and Michael 'Mike' Stoffi (lead guitar), which achieved considerable popularity in the region.

Top 40 Radio / First U.S. nightclub disc jockey 
 

In 1964, at the age of 23, having completed a 13-week training program at the Columbia School of Broadcasting in Washington, D.C., White began working at WHVW AM 950 in Hyde Park, N.Y. WHVW covered most of the Hudson Valley, and was known as 'Live 95'. While at WHVW, White hosted a two-hour daily morning news program, a drive-time show from 4 PM until station sign-off, and also occasionally hosted a talk show called Open Line. Between programs, he either sold advertising for the station or worked in the studio to produce ads.

Banking upon the notoriety of his highly rated WHVW afternoon drive show, White was hired by some students at Vassar College in Poughkeepsie, N.Y. to DJ a themed dance at the college promoted under the name 'Discotheque'.  The dance was based on the discotheque club concept the students had discovered in Europe the previous summer.  This event would become the first known discotheque dance in the United States.

That same year, based on what he had learned at the Vassar dance, White and a business partner, Bill DeCesare (the WHVW sales manager), opened the first discotheque in the United States, the Rumpus Room Nightclub & Discotheque, in Dover Plains, N.Y., where the drinking age was 18.

The Rumpus Room was only a few miles from the Connecticut border, where the legal drinking age was 21, and the club was wildly successful until it was destroyed by fire in the early 1970s.

The club featured live bands, DJ'd music from White, and headline performances from noted recording stars. By deejaying professionally from a booth at the club, White unintentionally became the first professional nightclub DJ in America beginning in 1965.

Booking agent 
From 1966 until 1967, White worked as the primary booking agent at the powerful Paramount Artists Corporation in Washington, D.C., an agency which specialized in booking touring bands. White was able to succeed by signing name acts he had known during his time at WHVW.

Paramount Artists exclusively represented and/or booked among others:
 The British Walkers ("I Found You," "Shake")
 Little Willie & the Hand Jives
 The Chartbusters ("She's the One")
 Dee Dee Sharp ("Mashed Potatoes", "Gravy", "Slow Twisting" (featuring Chubby Checker)
 The Kalin Twins ("When")
 Jimmy Jones ("Handy Man", "Good Timin'")
 The Crystals ("He's a Rebel","Da Doo Ron Ron")
 The Shangri-Las ("Leader of the Pack","Remember (Walking in the Sand)"
 guitarist Roy Buchanan
 Len Barry of The Dovells ("1-2-3", "Like a Baby," and "Somewhere")

In late 1967, White departed Paramount Artists, and moved to Action Talents agency located at the legendary 1650 Broadway Building in New York City. Action Talents was an agency that received financing and support from Neil Bogart of Buddah Records. Bogart was an innovator and cleverly sought for artists with singles released on Buddah to be booked into areas where their records were breaking.

Action Talents was helmed by Betty Sperber and White during this period, and under their leadership, Bogart achieved his goal.

While at Action Talents, Alan represented a number of the biggest pop acts of the period, including The Lemon Pipers (Green Tambourine), The Ohio Express (Yummy Yummy Yummy (I've Got Love In My Tummy)), The 1910 Fruitgum Company (Simon Says, 1, 2, 3, Red Light),  Joey Dee and the Starliters (Peppermint Twist, Hot Pastrami with Mashed Potatoes), The Music Explosion (Little Bit O'Soul), The Five Stairsteps and Cubie, (O-o-h Child), Johnny Maestro and The Crests (16 Candles, Step By Step, The Angels Listened In, Trouble in Paradise), The Del Satins (a vocal quartet made famous on the local New York City-based Clay Cole Show), Jordan Christopher and The Wild Ones, The Kasenetz-Katz Singing Orchestral Circus (Quick Joey Small) and White's own personal discovery: The Peppermint Rainbow (Will You Be Staying After Sunday?).

Action Talents also exclusively booked acts into over 100 Hullabaloo Teen Clubs, franchised across America by Trans America investment group, due to the popularity of the TV series of the same name.

White soon became an integral at Betty Sperber's Action Talents agency. One Monday night in 1968, Sperber and White were hosting a monthly 'Battle of the Bands' talent search at the Cloud Nine nightclub in Long Island, and brought Johnny Maestro along as the evening's special guest star.

White—who was then Action Talents' Vice President and General Manager—suggested that Maestro be backed up that night by a seven-piece brass-filled group of young musicians called The Rhythm Method. That night's performance was so successful that the following day, Sperber decided to combine the talents of Maestro, the four Del-Satins, and The Rhythm Method. The new group's name came about when White made the off-handed comment that "it would be easier to sell the Brooklyn Bridge" than find bookings for this proposed 11-piece act.

When the band was first introduced to the public, it happened in an appearance on the Brooklyn Bridge featuring the new 11-piece band, Bogart, Sperber and the Mayor of Brooklyn, N.Y.

Disco era

Talent manager 
In 1969, White moved to Philadelphia to become the personal manager and booking agent for his friend, 1960s rock and roll star and former Dovells lead singer Len Barry.   At the time, Barry was producing what would become the first two disco records: Who Can I Turn To and a cover of Johnny Ray's 1950s classic, Cry, both by Atlanta R&B singer Grover Mitchell.

While neither record became a hit, the next Barry-produced dance recording was Keem-O-Sabe by The Electric Indian and that record would become the first disco record ever to crack the national charts, reaching number 16 on the Billboard Hot 100 in August 1969.

During this period, White managed Barry's career as Len continued to produce new music in addition to performing. Barry's core group of studio musicians at the time included such now-legendary performers as Vince Montana, Daryl Hall, John Oates, Bobby Eli, Roland Chambers, and Earl Young; many of whom would go on to success both as studio musicians known as MSFB (who played behind the run of disco hits from Philadelphia's Gamble and Huff-helmed Philadelphia International Records (TSOP), as part of groups such as The Trammps (Disco Inferno) and Hall & Oates, backing artists like Harold Melvin & The Blue Notes (The Love I Lost, Lou Rawls, and The Three Degrees, and as solo performers.

In 1972, using these same studio musicians, White produced a middle-of-the-road version of The Theme from M*A*S*H, which was later released on Hickory Records just as the television series debuted.

Nightclub DJ 
Eventually, Alan changed directions and returned to radio. Between 1972-1973, he served as a sidekick to Peter 'The Flying Dutchman' Berry of Baltimore's WFBR 1300 AM. Berry's morning show on Mad Radio 13—as it was known at the time—consistently dominated ratings in the Baltimore market.

In addition to working on-air with The Dutchman, White also provided marketing and consulting services for area restaurants and nightclubs.

By 1974, he had also returned to DJing in nightclubs and played and programmed music in a variety of nightclubs as he toured along the East Coast.

In 1975, while performing at Emerson's Restaurant in downtown Baltimore, he was presented with a proclamation by then-Mayor William Donald Schaefer naming White The Evening Mayor of Baltimore, in appreciation of his contributions to bringing nighttime business back into Baltimore's downtown.

Saturday Night Fever 
In 1976, due to his notoriety as the first American nightclub DJ, White appeared on Maury Povich's highly rated Washington, D.C. based news and interview show, Panorama. A second guest on the same segment was British writer Nik Cohn, who was promoting a book of photographs of oil paintings of famous rock stars titled "Rock Dreams", to which he had contributed liner notes to accompany each photograph. The conversation centered on two topics: the James Dean movie Rebel Without a Cause, and White's disco career. At the end of the show, following White's declaration that Disco would be the next big thing, Povich turned to Cohn and quipped 'You should re-write Rebel Without a Cause and turn it into a disco movie!' Cohn did, in fact, rewrite Rebel, not as a movie script, but as a fictionalized account which would be published in 1976 in New York Magazine under the title 'Tribal Rites of the New Saturday Night.' This article ultimately found its way to Cohn's good friend, talent manager and music industry impresario Robert Stigwood, who at the time was seeking a story to use as a vehicle for a musical film featuring his artists The Bee Gees. Stigwood optioned Tribal Rites of the New Saturday Night for what would eventually become the script for the film Saturday Night Fever. And so, as Povich suggested, Rebel Without a Cause was rewritten into a disco movie after all.

Disco and beyond 
White settled in Atlanta, Georgia in 1977 and became the resident DJ and musical director at Jeryl's, which was Atlanta's most prominent mainstream disco venue during that era.

He was the on-camera television spokesman for the Georgia School of Bartending, which ran frequent late night advertisements on Ted Turner's soon-to-be Superstation WTBS over the next few years.

White received a gold record, both for his recommendation of remix artist Jim Burgess, and for his promotional efforts which helped nationally break Burgess's 12" remix of Alicia Bridges' I Love the Nightlife in 1978.

In the early 1980s, he would perform on and produce a couple of novelty records for his own label Hot Hits Records, including a new wave remake of The Name Game, which charted on various dance club charts in Europe, where it was exclusively released.

White also produced a full LP of local Atlanta talent titled The Atlanta All-Stars in 1989.  The album included work from recording artists Jayne Doe (now working as Sugar Kayne), Linda Susan, and Men in White.  Most of the tracks were co-produced and mixed by Aron Siegel and Randy "Spike" Dethman. White continued to enjoy performing in nightclubs, and in 1986, would settle into a position as music director and resident DJ at Atlanta's Johnny's Hideaway. He would serve there in this capacity until the mid-1990s.

Swing revival 
In 1998, White began to DJ and promote dance events for young Atlanta-area swing dancers, who had become caught up in a resurgence of interest in swing music and dancing which would later come to be known as the Swing Revival or the Neo-Swing movement. Popularly known as The Swing Kids, this trend was led musically by artists like Brian Setzer, Big Bad Voodoo Daddy, Squirrel Nut Zippers and Indigo Swing. White would become the preeminent DJ for the Atlanta Swing Kids over the ensuing decade.

In 2001, White—along with web designer Dr. Clio Soleil—launched an internet radio station called SwingTop40Radio.com. Over the course of two years, White produced and hosted 108 weekly Top 40 countdown shows, with songs voted upon by reporting swing DJs from around the world.

In 2002, SwingTop40Radio.com would partner with SwingAwards.com to digitally produce the first of two special broadcasts that served as a 'virtual' formal awards program for the neo-swing music industry.

When SwingTop40Radio ceased production in April 2003, the individual show segments were archived online. These archived programs served as a detailed historical record of the swing music revival of the late 1990s and early 2000s.

On Memorial Day weekend of 2005, Alan White was inducted into the Swing DJs Hall of Fame.

Present day 
White continues to DJ and promotes dance events throughout Atlanta area. He appeared on Friday nights at Nemoe's Tavern in Norcross, GA—opposite top show and dance bands he booked into the venue—until its closing in November, 2018.

He also runs a Modern Jive dance promotion company called JiveBop, and its associated internet radio station, JiveBopRadio.com, which play music optimized for Modern Jive dancers. Modern Jive is a partner dance craze which has surged in popularity in England, Australia and beyond. JiveBopRadio is based on the classic Top 40 AM radio format, and White plays a character called The Old Jive Daddy who, along with a collection of pre-recorded voices he has dubbed 'The Voices In My Head,' hosts the show. JiveBop music is interspersed with authentic AM radio jingles produced for the company by PAMS, the noted jingle production company.

A flagship JiveBop Teen Center is planned for Atlanta, where an internet-streamed JiveBop television dance party show called The JiveBop TV Dance Party Show will be streamed globally daily from the center.

In February 2019, White published his memoir Rock Around the Block featuring stories of his adventures in the talent management industry, and as a nightclub DJ and radio personality.

Personal life 
White currently resides in Chamblee, Georgia.

He is divorced, and the father of two sons: Alan White, Jr. (born 1991), and Zachary (born 1995).

Awards 
 Gold Record - 1-2-3 - Len Barry
 Gold Record - I Love the Nightlife (Disco Round) - Alicia Bridges
 Evening Mayor of Baltimore (1975)
 Lifetime Achievement Award - International Disco Association
 Honorary lifetime member - Atlanta Swing Dancers Club

References

External links 
 Jive Bop Radio (streaming programming)
 The archived radio programs of SwingTop40.com
 Global Swing DJs Hall of Fame
 
 
 

1941 births
American radio personalities
American writers
American DJs
Businesspeople from Bridgeport, Connecticut
People from Torrington, Connecticut
Living people
People from Chamblee, Georgia